Winslow is an unincorporated community in Jefferson County, in the U.S. state of Pennsylvania.

History
A post office was established as Hudson in 1869, the name was changed to Winslow in 1888, and the post office closed in 1923. Augustus G. Winslow was the first postmaster.

References

Unincorporated communities in Jefferson County, Pennsylvania
Unincorporated communities in Pennsylvania